Pascal Dupuis (born April 7, 1979) is a Canadian former  professional ice hockey left winger. Dupuis played 14 seasons in the NHL for the Minnesota Wild, New York Rangers, Atlanta Thrashers, and Pittsburgh Penguins. Dupuis retired in December 2015 due to health issues, although contractually he remained on the  Pittsburgh Penguins’ long-term injury reserve list until the end of the 2016–17 NHL season. He was part of 2 Stanley Cups championships in his career both with Pittsburgh in 2009 and 2016.

Playing career 
As a youth, Dupuis played in the 1993 Quebec International Pee-Wee Hockey Tournament with a minor ice hockey team from the Mille-Îles area of Laval, Quebec.

Dupuis started his career with the Rouyn-Noranda Huskies of the Quebec Major Junior Hockey League. He played four seasons in the QMJHL, but was never drafted by an NHL club. On August 18, 2000, he was signed by the Minnesota Wild. It took Dupuis a year of development in the International Hockey League before he became a regular player in the NHL. In his second full season, he scored 20 goals and 48 points while having a plus-minus rating of +17. However, in 2003–04, he was bothered by injuries and he was unable to improve on his totals from the previous year.

During the 2004–05 NHL lock-out, Dupuis played 8 games for HC Ajoie of the Swiss League.

When the NHL returned in 2005–06, Dupuis managed only 26 points in 67 games. After 48 games with the Wild in the 2006–07 season, he was traded to the New York Rangers for Adam Hall on February 9, 2007. On February 27, 2007, he was traded again, this time to the Atlanta Thrashers for Alex Bourret. On February 9, 2008, he was traded to the Pittsburgh Penguins, where he helped them to the 2008 Stanley Cup Finals. He won the Stanley Cup with Pittsburgh in 2009. On June 28, 2011, he re-signed for 2 more years, keeping him through the 2012–13 season.

On December 11, 2008, in his 461st game, Dupuis scored his first NHL hat-trick in a game against the New York Islanders. On November 14, 2009, he earned his 100th career goal, an overtime game winner against the Boston Bruins.

As an impending free agent on July 2, 2013, Dupuis opted to remain in Pittsburgh and re-signed to a four-year contract extension.

In the 2013–14 season, on December 23, 2013, Dupuis suffered a season ending knee injury (torn right anterior cruciate ligament). Teammate Sidney Crosby was hip-checked by Senators defenceman Marc Methot. Crosby then collided with Dupuis, who went crashing to the boards. He was helped off the ice and did not return. The Penguins lost 5–0 to the Senators, ending a 7-game winning streak, in which Dupuis had scored 3 goals and 2 assists during the streak.

On February 12, 2014, after a long seven-and-a-half-week wait between injury and appointment, he underwent successful surgery to repair his ACL.

On October 16, 2014, during the second period of a game against the Dallas Stars, Dupuis was crosschecked to the ice by an opponent and while prone was struck by the puck near the back of his neck on a shot by teammate Kris Letang.  Dupuis dropped to his knees and then laid on the ice for several minutes while attended to by medical staff from both teams.  He was eventually stretchered off the ice.  Dupuis would return to action days later.

On November 19, 2014, Dupuis was diagnosed with a blood clot in the lung. He did not play the day before in Montreal and left practice two days before with tightness in his chest. The medical staff said that the blood clot travelled from the leg to the lung. Expected to be out six months, he did not play for the remainder of the 2014–15 season. It was the second such incident for Dupuis; he had previously been diagnosed with a blood clot in January 2014, shortly after he suffered the knee injury, and was on blood thinners for six months while recovering from surgery and rehabilitating his knee.

Dupuis returned to play in to the 2015–16 season, featuring in 18 games for 4 points despite continuing to suffer from lingering health concerns related to blood clots. On December 8, 2015, having twice left games in progress due to ill health, he announced that he was unable to play hockey any longer. He was placed on long-term injured reserve but remained under contract with the Penguins. Since retiring from the NHL, Dupuis has remained active with the Penguins organization. Although he retired in December, Dupuis was able to lift the Stanley Cup when the Pittsburgh Penguins won their fourth Stanley Cup in the 2016 Stanley Cup Finals.

Personal 
Dupuis is the son of Claude Dupuis, a former draft pick of the Quebec Nordiques who played 120 games in the North American Hockey League.

Dupuis is married to Carole-Lyne and they have four children.

Career statistics

Awards and honours

References 
 2005 NHL Official Guide & Record Book

External links 
 

1979 births
Atlanta Thrashers players
Canadian ice hockey left wingers
French Quebecers
Living people
Minnesota Wild players
New York Rangers players
Sportspeople from Laval, Quebec
Pittsburgh Penguins players
Rouyn-Noranda Huskies players
Shawinigan Cataractes players
Stanley Cup champions
Undrafted National Hockey League players
Ice hockey people from Quebec
Canadian expatriate ice hockey players in Switzerland
Canadian ice hockey right wingers